Sotto il segno dello scorpione (internationally released as Under the Sign of Scorpio) is a 1969 Italian drama film directed by Paolo and Vittorio Taviani. It was screened at the Venice Film Festival.

The film was defined as: "perhaps the Tavianis' most advanced film for creative originality and stylistic research".

Cast 
Gian Maria Volonté: Renno
Lucia Bosè: Glaia
Giulio Brogi: Rutolo
Samy Pavel: Taleno
Renato Scarpa
Alessandro Haber

References

External links

1969 films
Films set on islands
Italian drama films
Films set in the Mediterranean Sea
Films directed by Paolo and Vittorio Taviani
1960s Italian-language films
1960s Italian films